Maxim Shulgin (born 17 May 1983) is a Russian volleyball player, a member of Russia men's national volleyball team and Russian club Lokomotiv Novosibirsk.

Career
In season 2013/14 he achieved with his Russian team Guberniya Nizhniy Novgorod silver medal of CEV Cup.

Sporting achievements

Clubs

CEV Cup
  2013/2014 - with Guberniya Nizhniy Novgorod

References

External links
 Volleyball-Movies profile

1983 births
Living people
Russian men's volleyball players
20th-century Russian people
21st-century Russian people